Black wattle is the common name for a number of species of trees that are native to Australia, as listed below:

Acacia aulacocarpa
Acacia auriculiformis, also known as Darwin Black Wattle or northern black wattle;  
Acacia concurrens 
Acacia crassicarpa
Acacia decurrens, also known as Early Black Wattle
Acacia hakeoides, also known as Western Black Battle
Acacia implexa
Acacia leiocalyx, also known as Early-flowering Black Wattle
Acacia mabellae
Acacia mangium
Acacia mearnsii, also known as Late Black Wattle and the species of tree that is known to be, commercially, the most important tannin producer in Southern Africa
Acacia melanoxylon, a 'timber' tree that is commonly known as Australian Blackwood
Acacia neriifolia 
Acacia plectocarpa
Acacia salicina
Acacia stenophylla 

It may also refer to Callicoma serratifolia, a tall shrub or tree which is also found in Australia.

References